Gauführer was an early paramilitary rank used by the Schutzstaffel (SS) between 1925 and 1929. Translated as "SS-region leader", the SS-Gauführer had command of several SS-Stafflen which were in turn commanded by an SS-Staffelführer.

The rank of Gauführer was influenced by the similar named Nazi Party position of Gauleiter. The insignia for a Gauführer was a swastika armband with two white stripes.

The rank of SS-Gauführer ceased to exist in 1929 when the SS-Gaus were re-consolidated into new SS units known as SS-Oberführerbereiche, each commanded by an SS-Oberführer.

SS ranks